Carol Lee, or Lee Mei-kuen (born 1963) is a Hong Kong-based contemporary artist. Her work speculates on the concepts of time, memories and human relationships, utilizing shape, juxtaposition, color, rhythm and intensity. She is one of the founding members of MIA (Mere Independent Artists). She uses a time-based painting technique.

Lee received an MFA degree from RMIT University.

Work 
Lee's work has been described as "visually minimal and static."

Works on paper
Lee's artwork usually consists of her tracing shadows of objects with a pencil on newsprint paper, cutting out a stencil and then exposing the paper (under the stencil) to sunlight. This causes the color of the paper to change and deepen in areas exposed to light.

The difference between photography and her works are that her methods do not include chemical substances that preserve color, therefore according to Lee, her work illustrates a philosophy of time painting.

Glass art
Lee also produces sculptures in plate glass. She had produced a chair fabricated in panels of transparent glass, as well as a robot, and other objects. These works have been exhibited at the Hong Kong Arts Center, the Alexander Tutsek-Stiftung Foundation, Munich, Germany, the Lviv Glass Museum, Ukraine, among other venues.

Exhibitions 
Exhibitions include:
 ‘Chinese Abstract painting competition’ in Macau Art Museum, 2008
 Glass China, Alexander Tutsek-stiftung, Germany, 2008
 Art Container Project West Kowloon Cultural District, 2008
 Beyond Luminosity, Fotan Loft, 2008
 Till the end of the World, 1a space, cattle depot, 2007
 Under-layers Sino group, 2006
 To set fire and stir wind, 10 Chancerylane Gallery, 2004

Collections
Her work is held in the permanent collection of the M+ Museum of modern and contemporary art in Kowloon.

References 

1963 births
Living people
Hong Kong women artists
Hong Kong artists
Glass artists